Konjineh (also Romanized as Konjīneh; also known as Ganjīneh, Kanjīna, and Kanjīyeh) is a village in Sangestan Rural District, in the Central District of Hamadan County, Hamadan Province, Iran. At the 2006 census, its population was 760, in 206 families.

References 

Populated places in Hamadan County